The Hinsberg reaction is a chemical test for the detection of primary, secondary and tertiary amines. The reaction was first described by Oscar Hinsberg in 1890. In this test, the amine is shaken well with Hinsberg reagent in the presence of aqueous alkali (either KOH or NaOH). A reagent containing an aqueous sodium hydroxide solution and benzenesulfonyl chloride is added to a substrate. A primary amine will form a soluble sulfonamide salt. Acidification of this salt then precipitates the sulfonamide of the primary amine. A secondary amine in the same reaction will directly form an insoluble sulfonamide. A tertiary amine will not react with the original reagent(benzene sulfonyl chloride) and will remain insoluble. After adding dilute acid this insoluble amine is converted to a soluble ammonium salt. Hinsberg test Is Used to distinguish between 1,2,3 degree amine with help of sulphonly cloride
In this way the reaction can distinguish between the three types of amines.

Tertiary amines are able to react with benzenesulfonyl chloride under a variety of conditions; the test described above is not absolute. The Hinsberg test for amines is valid only when reaction speed, concentration, temperature, and solubility are taken into account.

Reactions 
Amines serve as nucleophiles in attacking the sulfonyl chloride electrophile, displacing chloride. The sulfonamides resulting from primary and secondary amines are poorly soluble and precipitate as solids from solution.

PhSO2Cl + 2 RR'NH → PhSO2NRR' + [RR'NH2+]Cl−

For primary amines (R' = H), the initially formed sulfonamide is deprotonated by base to give a water-soluble sulfonamide salt (Na[PhSO2NR]).

PhSO2N(H)R + NaOH → Na+[PhSO2NR−] + H2O

Tertiary amines promote hydrolysis of the sulfonyl chloride functional group, which affords water-soluble sulfonate salts.

PhSO2Cl + R3N + H2O → R3NH+[PhSO] + HCl

References

External links 

 Laboratory procedure: science.csustan.edu

Chemical tests